Kakkalli or Kokkalli is a village in Uttara Kannada district of Sirsi taluk in Karnataka. There are 227 people in Kakkalli currently.  Nearest towns from Kakkalli were:
 Sirsi  (20 km)
 Yellapur (30 km)
 Ankola (40 km)
 Hubli (100 km)

References 

Villages in Uttara Kannada district